
An alumni magazine is a magazine published by a university, college, or other school or by an association of a school's alumni (and sometimes current students) in order to keep alumni abreast of fellow alumni and news of their university, often with an implicit goal of fundraising.

An emerging version of alumni magazines are unrelated to educational institutions. Instead the intended readers are former employees of a company. An example of this type of alumni magazine is MoForever magazine of the law firm of Morrison & Foerster.

History
The oldest alumni magazine in the United States is Wayland Academy's Greetings, founded in 1882.  Still published today, Greetings was initially mailed to Baptist families throughout Wisconsin, but by the July 1888 issue was devoted to "give former students a picture of present Wayland life and to furnish information regarding those who have once been its students." The oldest known university alumni magazine isYale Alumni Magazine, founded in 1891. Chartered in 1636, Harvard University—the oldest university in the U.S.--established an official alumni association in 1840 but did not publish the Harvard Bulletin until 1898. Seven years earlier, Yale University began publishing a weekly alumni publication, which has been credited as the first such periodical that dealt solely with college or university alumni matters. In 1894, Princeton University started producing the Alumni Princetonian in the Saturday edition of the student newspaper. The College of Wooster, however, has been credited as the first institution to publish an alumni magazine-the Alumni Bulletin-in 1886.

Role of Alumni Magazines 
"The role of college and university magazines is to inform, interpret, interest, and at times to inspire."    Over the years, the role of these magazines has evolved from serving solely as house organs of college and university administrations to independent journalistic voices that report about campus life, even if the stories may negatively portray the university that sponsors the publication.  Alumni magazines generally report to different university departments. "Most of the magazines receive some support from gifts, the college and alumni.   Some editors report to the alumni association, while other report to the offices of alumni relations or development."The editor of the University of Idaho alumni magazine Idaho the University explicitly stated his view of the role of these publications: "Good university magazines hold themselves a little apart from the universities they serve and even farther apart from their alumni offices.  They are not disloyal, but they are honest.  That touch of independence is a reality check: There is a larger world  to be served than just that of the university."   Almost two decades earlier, Mark Singer, the former associate editor of the Yale Alumni Magazine also had strong views about the importance of maintaining an independent campus voice: "An alumni magazine should be a vehicle for continuing education; the publication that functions as a house organ is bound to estrange its audience from the intellectual life of the institution."

In April 1998, about 175 college and university alumni editors asked the Council for the Advancement and Support of Education (CASE) to endorse a statement affirming the right of editorial freedom in their publications. Editors "should be assured the freedom to exercise their editorial judgment without censorship, within the framework of agree-upon editorial policy."  The statement updated an earlier version on professional standards endorsed by the American Alumni Council, the predecessor of CASE.  The proposed standards "balances good and bad news" and gives a "complete picture of the institution.   The editors called on CASE to adopt the standards for all of its members and mediate disputes between editors and the university administration.   This current discussion partially arose because of the controversial 1995 retirement of  Anthony Lyle, the editor of the University of Pennsylvania alumni magazine, Pennsylvania Gazette who published some articles that upset the Penn university administration.

CASE refused the request and in October 1998 its commission on communications "concluded that it is not within CASE's mission to sponsor, endorse, or mediate the job conditions for any group of professionals within the association."

Readership
Although there are several thousand college and university alumni magazines, no comprehensive listing of these publications has been published. In 2013, the Council for Advancement and Support of Education (CASE) published a study on some alumni magazine readers. Some of their findings from 252 participating institutions:

 "Readers of all ages prefer print magazines, and, secondly, a combination of print and online"
 45% of respondents acquire information from their alma mater; 35% from emails from institution
 17% spend 60 minutes or more reading the magazine; 40% spend 30–59 minutes; 31% 10–29 minutes
 86% strongly agree or just agree that the magazine strengthens their personal connection to the institution
 39% saved magazine article; 34% recommended school to students; 16% submitted "Class Notes"
 Magazine credibility as a source of information about the institution: 28% "consistently portrays the institution accurately and objectively; 39% "contains some 'spin' but is generally accurate and objective; 18% usually portrays the institution only in a positive light; 3% is "not a good source of objective information."

Ivy League Magazine Network (Brown, Cornell, Dartmouth, Harvard, Princeton, Stanford, University of Chicago, University of Pennsylvania, Yale) conducts surveys of its member institutions. The 2019 Media Kit published the following findings about the alumni readers of these magazines:

 76% said it is the "primary way I stay connected to my school".
 89% "took action as a result of seeing an article or ad."
 73% "read it as soon as it arrives in my mailbox."
 The total circulation of the nine alumni magazines is 1,300,908

Controversies 

 In September 2015, the editors of the Cornell Alumni magazine apologized for a cover photograph which featured a split-page photograph of four white students and on the other side a color photograph of four Asian students.   The cover caption: "Collegetown is changing fast.  Is that a good thing?"  Sophie Sidhu, associate dean and director of the Asian and Asian American Center was disturbed by the cover.  "While I believe that this was a poor editorial choice and not intentionally racist or malicious, it inadvertently sends a hurtful message that is neither accepted nor supported by Cornell."
In November 2011, the national media reported that Jerry Sandusky the assistant football coach at Pennsylvania State University perpetrated multiple child molestation incidents, the Penn Stater  alumni magazine was in a quandary about how to report on this notorious crime which so adversely affected the entire university community
In 1991, when the editor of the University of Idaho alumni magazine wrote an article for that publication on Philadelphia's homeless population, his piece unleashed a controversy about the mission of alumni magazines.   In response, the Assistant Director of the University of Idaho Foundation, wrote that the "purpose of the magazine, as made explicit by its title, Idaho the University is to report the research, scholarship, teaching and contributions by the faculty, staff, and students of the University of Idaho to the State of Idaho and alumni and friends of this institution   .    .     .   We have no ambition to be a national magazine or to discuss current literary, historical, sociological, economic or scientific matters not pertinent to what is going on at the University of Idaho or in the State of Idaho."
 In 1982, Dartmouth President David T. McLaughlin placed Dennis A. Dinan,  editor of the Dartmouth Alumni Magazine, on probation if he didn't publish more positive stories about the College.  Dinan, who formerly worked at American Heritage, recalled that the president told him that the magazine had "gone out of its way" to portray the school in a negative light.  The editor decided that the prospect of probation was 'intolerable' and resigned his position on December 31, 1982.

Awards for Excellence 
The Robert Sibley Magazine of the Year award, which bears the name of a former editor of the University of California at Berkeley's alumni monthly, helped initiate the award in 1943 which is the highest award given to alumni magazine editors.  The first awards focusing on editorial excellence and achievement by alumni magazines were awarded by the American Alumni Council in 1929.  More than 100 magazines competed for awards recognizing best editorial and best story on the achievement of an alumnus, among other topics. California Monthly—the predecessor publication to California, the alumni publication of the University of California, Berkeley—took home top honors for articles about alumni. Robert Sibley was the editor of the winning publication.

Recent Award Recipients 

 2020 LMU Magazine, Joseph Wakelee-Lynch, editor
2019 Wake Forest Magazine, Maria Henson, editor
 2018 HBS Alumni Bulletin, Tom Witkowski, editor
2017 TCNJ Magazine, Renee Olson, editor
 2016 UofTMed, Heidi Singer, editor
 2015 Johns Hopkins Magazine, Dale Keiger, editor
 2014 Kenyon College Alumni Bulletin, Shawn Presley, editor
 2013 Harvard Medicine, Harvard University, Ann Marie Menting, editor
 2012 University of Chicago Magazine, Amy Puma, editor
 2011 Kenyon College Alumni Bulletin, Shawn Presley, editor
 2010 CAM, University of Cambridge, Mira Katbamna, editor

List of alumni magazines

0-9

A

B

C

D

E

F
{|class="wikitable"
|-
!Magazine name!!Educational institution
|-
| Farmington First
| University of Maine at Farmington
|-
| Flagler College Magazine
| Flagler College
|-
| Florida Gator Magazine
| University of Florida
|-
| Florida State Law
| Florida State University College of Law
|-
| Fordham News
| Fordham University
|-
| Forward
| Seton Hall University
|-
| Fox Focus
| Temple University's Fox School of  Business
|-
| Foxcraft
| Foxcroft Academy
|-
| Framingham State
| Framingham State University
|-
| Franklin College Magazine
| Franklin College (Indiana)
|-
| Furman Magazine (South Carolina) [Furman University]

G

H

I

J

K

L

M

N

O

P

Q

R

S

T

U

V

W

Y

Notes

References

Academic terminology